The R676 road is a regional road in Ireland. It connects the N25 road in County Waterford to the N24 at Carrick-on-Suir, County Tipperary, via the villages of Mahon Bridge and Carrickbeg.

References

Regional roads in the Republic of Ireland
Roads in County Tipperary
Roads in County Waterford